Trinchera is an unincorporated community and a U.S. Post Office located in Las Animas County, Colorado, United States.  The Trinchera Post Office has the ZIP Code 81081.

A post office called Trinchera has been in operation since 1889. Trinchera is a name derived from Spanish meaning "trench".

Geography 
Trinchera is located at  (37.042847,-104.047565).

References 

Unincorporated communities in Las Animas County, Colorado
Unincorporated communities in Colorado